Ethylenediamine dihydroiodide (EDDI) is a water-soluble salt derived from ethylenediamine and hydroiodic acid.  It is a colorless to light yellow crystalline powder. The salt consists of the ethylenediammonium dication C2H4(NH3)22+ and iodide anions.

Application
EDDI is used as an additive in pet food and cattle feed with high bioavailability.  Used to prevent iodine deficiency, this salt is one of the major uses of the element iodine.  The United States Food and Drug Administration suggests a limit of intake to 50 mg/head/day.  Although EDDI is generally recognized as safe (GRAS) only as a nutrient source of iodine, administration of EDDI also has preventative effects on foot rot in cattle.

Other iodine supplements for animal feed include calcium iodate (most stable) and potassium iodide.

See also
Calcium iodates are another source of nutritional iodide.

References

Diamines
Food additives
Iodides